Doodia linearis (synonym Blechnum lineare) is a small fern found in eastern Australia. The habitat is sloping ground, often by creeks, in rainforest or dry eucalyptus forest.

References

Blechnaceae
Ferns of Australasia
Flora of New South Wales
Flora of Queensland